The cuisine of Toronto reflects Toronto's size and multicultural diversity.  Ethnic neighbourhoods throughout the city focus on specific cuisines, such as authentic Chinese and Vietnamese found in the city's Chinatowns, Korean in Koreatown, Greek on The Danforth, Italian cuisine in Little Italy and Corso Italia, and Indian/Pakistani in Little India. Other world cuisines available in the city include Portuguese, Hungarian, Japanese, and Caribbean. Toronto's large Jewish population has given rise to many Jewish restaurants and delis, with varying adherence to kosher rules.

Neighbourhoods with prominent ethnic food

 Eglinton West – Caribbean food
 Roncesvalles – Polish cuisine
 Chinatown and East Chinatown– Chinese and Vietnamese food
 Kensington Market – Latin American, Vietnamese, Japanese, Turkish, Mexican and others
 Little Italy and Corso Italia – Italian
 Gerrard India Bazaar and Rexdale – Indian and Pakistani
 Agincourt – Chinese, Korean, Japanese, Vietnamese, South Indian, Sri Lankan
 Clanton Park and Lawrence Manor – Jewish, Filipino 
 Wexford - Japanese, Vietnamese, South Indian, Afghani, Sri Lankan, Iraqi, Lebanese, Pakistani, Egyptian, Filipino, Syrian, East African
 Koreatown – Korean
 Little Portugal/Rua Acores – Portuguese
 The Danforth – Greek, Turkish 
 The Annex – Hungarian (historically)
 North York City Centre, Newtonbrook - Korean, Chinese, Iranian

Chefs
Notable chefs from or based in Toronto:

 Susur Lee
 Massimo Capra
 Jamie Kennedy 
 Brad Long
 Pasquale Carpino
 Christine Cushing
 David Adjey
 Mark McEwan
 Lynn Crawford
 Marc Thuet
 David Rocco
 Guy Rubino
 Claudio Aprile
 Michael Bonacini
 Matty Matheson
 Sash Simpson

Food-related personalities

 Kevin Brauch
 Jamie Drummond
 Charles Khabouth

Breweries

Toronto has a long history of beer brewing. Eugene O'Keefe, founder of O'Keefe Brewing Company, grew up in Toronto, to which his family had emigrated from Ireland in 1832. O'Keefe was the first to produce lager beer in Canada along with the traditional ale and porter. 

Notable breweries in the city include Amsterdam Brewing Company, Mill Street Brewery, and Steam Whistle Brewing.

See also

 Canadian Chinese cuisine
 Canadian cuisine
 Culture in Toronto: Food

References

External links
 The Dominion Home Cookbook – A recipe book published in Toronto in 1868.  Pages are available in PDF format.
 Toronto's Key Industry Clusters: Food & Beverage
 Taste T.O. – a website covering Toronto's food & drink scene.
 Dine Palace — Ultimate Restaurant Dining Guide  – A website with full database about various cuisine restaurants in Toronto.

 
Toronto